David Penrose Buckson (July 25, 1920 – January 17, 2017) was an American lawyer and politician from Camden in Kent County, Delaware. He was a veteran of World War II and a member of the Republican Party, who served as the 15th Lieutenant Governor of Delaware, for nineteen days the 63rd Governor of Delaware and the 37th Attorney General of Delaware.

Early life and family
Buckson was born in Townsend, Delaware, the son of Leon and Margaret Hutchison Buckson. He first married Betty Savin in 1945 with whom he had two children, Deborah Gray, and Brian Roth. His second wife was Patricia Maloney, whom he married in 1962 and with whom he had four children, Marlee, David, Eric, and Kent. They were members of the Methodist Church. He graduated from the University of Delaware in 1941 with a commission as a second lieutenant in the U.S. Army. During World War II Buckson served in the South Pacific and attained the rank of major. Afterwards he resumed legal studies, at Dickinson College Law School in Carlisle, Pennsylvania. Buckson is the founder of Dover Downs, opening in 1969 a harness racing track that was also encompassed by the NASCAR race track which began racing the same year. Buckson died on January 17, 2017, at the Delaware Veterans Home in Milford, Delaware.

Lieutenant Governor and Governor of Delaware

He was appointed a judge in the Court of Common Pleas in 1955. A year later, he was elected lieutenant-governor, defeating Vernon Derrickson. He served one term from January 15, 1957, to December 30, 1960. Near the end of his term, in 1960, he sought the Republican Party nomination for governor, but lost it to John W. Rollins. However, he became governor when Governor J. Caleb Boggs resigned to start his first U.S. Senate term, and served the remaining 18 days of Boggs' second term.

Professional and political career
Buckson was elected Delaware's attorney-general in 1962 and served two terms, from January 15, 1963, to January 19, 1971. He ran for governor again in 1964 but lost to Democratic former Chief Justice Charles L. Terry, Jr., and in 1972, when he failed to receive the Republican nomination.

Buckson was later appointed by Governor Sherman W. Tribbitt to be a judge in the Family Court of Delaware.

Buckson was the first Delaware attorney to have offices in more than one county. He was the founder of Dover Downs, a volunteer fireman, a decorated World War II officer, and commander of a National Guard unit. Buckson was also simultaneously city solicitor for the Delaware municipalities of Newark, Middletown, Townsend, Smyrna, Clayton, and Dover.

Buckson died on January 17, 2017, in Milford. At the time of his death, he was the oldest living state governor.

References

Images
Hall of Governors Portrait Gallery; Portrait courtesy of Historical and Cultural Affairs, Dover.

External links
Biographical Directory of the Governors of the United States
Delaware’s Governors 
The Political Graveyard 
Delaware Historical Society; website; 505 North Market Street, Wilmington, Delaware 19801; (302) 655-7161
University of Delaware; Library website; 181 South College Avenue, Newark, Delaware 19717; (302) 831–2965

|-

|-

|-

|-

1920 births
2017 deaths
United States Army personnel of World War II
Delaware Attorneys General
Delaware Court of Common Pleas judges
Delaware lawyers
Dickinson School of Law alumni
Republican Party governors of Delaware
Lieutenant Governors of Delaware
People from Camden, Delaware
People from New Castle County, Delaware
University of Delaware alumni
American United Methodists
United States Army officers
20th-century American judges
20th-century American lawyers
20th-century Methodists